Darko Planinić (born November 22, 1990) is a Croatian professional basketball player for CSO Voluntari of the Liga Națională. Standing at 2.11 m, he plays at the center position.

Professional career
Planinić spent the 2019-20 season with U BT Cluj-Napoca and averaged 15.9 points and 5 rebounds per game. He signed with Zadar on August 28, 2020.

On November 29, 2020, he has signed with Cibona of the ABA League.

On July 9, 2021, he has signed with Petkim Spor of the Turkish Basketball Super League.

On June 20, 2022, he has signed with CSO Voluntari of the Liga Națională.

References

External links

Euroleague profile
FIBA profile

1990 births
Living people
ABA League players
Basketball players at the 2016 Summer Olympics
Basketball players from Mostar
CB Gran Canaria players
Centers (basketball)
Croatian expatriate basketball people in Israel
Croatian expatriate basketball people in Italy
Croatian expatriate basketball people in Spain
Croatian expatriate basketball people in Montenegro
Croatian men's basketball players
Croats of Bosnia and Herzegovina
CS Universitatea Cluj-Napoca (men's basketball) players
CSO Voluntari players
Croatian expatriate basketball people in Romania
HKK Široki players
Israeli Basketball Premier League players
KK Budućnost players
KK Cibona players
KK Zadar players
Liga ACB players
Maccabi Tel Aviv B.C. players
Olympic basketball players of Croatia
Petkim Spor players
Saski Baskonia players